Yan dynasty may refer to:
 Former Yan (337–370)
 Later Yan (384–407/9)
 Southern Yan (398–410)
 Northern Yan (407/9–436)
 Yan (An–Shi) (756–763), established in the An Lushan Rebellion
 Yan (Five Dynasties period) (911–913)